Naseeruddin Shah (born 20 July 1950) is an Indian actor and director. He has acted in over 100 films and directed the 2006 Bollywood film, Yun Hota Toh Kya Hota, starring Irrfan Khan and Konkana Sen Sharma.

He began his acting career playing Vishwan in the 1975 Hindi film, Nishant. Since then, he has done several movies in English and some regional languages of India while he mainly appeared in Hindi films.

He launched his autobiography in the year 2014, titled And then one day: A Memoir.

Films

As director
Yun Hota To Kya Hota (2006)

Short films

Television

Writing

References

Male actor filmographies
Indian filmographies